James T. Hill Jr. was a lawyer with the United States Department of the Navy and the United States Department of the Air Force.

Hill joined the Department of the Navy's Office of General Counsel (DON-OGC) in 1944.  From August 24, 1946 until May 15, 1947, he was General Counsel of the Navy.

In 1950, President of the United States Harry Truman named Hill General Counsel of the Air Force.  He held this position until 1952, when he was promoted and became an Assistant Secretary of the Air Force, a post he held until 1953.

References
Papers at the Truman Library

1892 births
1978 deaths
General Counsels of the United States Navy
United States Air Force civilians